6 Rms Riv Vu is a play by Bob Randall, who also wrote the book for The Magic Show.

Play
6 Rms Riv Vu derives its title from shorthand used by real estate agents in classified advertising. In this case, a six-room apartment with a view of the Hudson River, located on Manhattan's Riverside Drive, serves as the comedy-drama's setting. Paul Friedman is a married advertising copywriter, Anne Miller is a discontented housewife, and the two meet when they respond to a listing in The New York Times for the available unit. They discover the door has  been locked accidentally, trapping them inside, and a connection slowly develops as they begin to share the details of their respective lives.

After nine previews, the Alexander H. Cohen production, directed by Edwin Sherin, had its Broadway premiere on October 17, 1972, at the Helen Hayes Theatre, where it ran for three months before transferring to the Lunt Fontanne for the remainder of its run, a total of 247 performances. The opening night cast included Jane Alexander, Jerry Orbach, Ron Harper, F. Murray Abraham, and Jennifer Warren.

Television film

In 1974, Carol Burnett and Alan Alda starred in a televised version that garnered both of them Emmy Award nominations. The film was directed by Alan Alda and Clark Jones.

Awards and honors
Tony Award for Best Actress in a Play (Alexander, nominee)
Theatre World Award (Warren, winner)
Drama Desk Award for Most Promising New Playwright (winner)

References

External links

 Internet Broadway Database listing

1972 plays
American plays
Broadway plays
Manhattan in fiction
Plays set in New York City